Inlay covers a range of techniques in sculpture and the decorative arts for inserting pieces of contrasting, often colored materials into depressions in a base object to form ornament or pictures that normally are flush with the matrix.  A great range of materials have been used both for the base or matrix and for the inlays inserted into it. Inlay is commonly used in the production of decorative furniture, where pieces of colored wood, precious metals or even diamonds are inserted into the surface of the carcass using various matrices including clear coats and varnishes. Lutherie inlays are frequently used as decoration and marking on musical instruments, particularly the smaller strings.

Perhaps the most famous example of furniture inlay is that of Andre-Charles Boulle (11 November 1642 – 28 February 1732)  which is known as Boulle work and evolved in part from inlay produced in Italy during the late 15th century at the Studiolo for Federico da Montefeltro in his Ducal Palace at Urbino, in which trompe-l'œil shelving seems to carry books, papers, curios and mathematical instruments, in eye-deceiving perspective. The similar private study made for him at Gubbio is now in the Metropolitan Museum of Art.

Inlay in wood

In a wood matrix, inlays commonly use wood veneers, but other materials like shells, mother-of-pearl, horn or ivory may also be used. Pietre dure, or coloured stones inlaid in white or black marbles, and inlays of precious metals in a base metal matrix are other forms of inlay.  Master craftsmen who make custom knives continue a tradition of ancient techniques of inlaying precious metals; additionally, many new techniques which use contemporary tools have also been developed and utilized as well by artisans.

Intarsia inlay in wood furniture differs from marquetry, a similar technique that largely replaced it in high-style European furniture during the 17th century, in that marquetry is an assembly of veneers applied over the entire surface of an object, whereas inlay consists of small pieces inserted on the bed of cut spaces in the base material, of which most remains visible.

Inlay on metals

The history of inlay is very old but it is still evolving alongside new technologies and new materials being discovered today. The technique of metal in metal inlay was sophisticated and accomplished in ancient China as shown in examples of vessels decorated with precious metals including this ding vessel (pictured) with gold and silver inlay from the Warring States period (403-221 BC).

The French cabinet maker Andre-Charles Boulle (1642-1732) specialized in furniture using inlays or metal and either wood or tortoiseshell together, the latter acting as the background. This type of inlay is known as "Boulle work".

After learning the skill of smithing from the Navaho in 1872, the Zuni silversmiths cut small chips from crystals and gemstones, pearl shell and coral, to make inlay designs in a base of silver.

In 1990, Vivienne Westwood was inspired by Boulle work, the inlay of precious metals into or onto wood to create a collection with inlay in the manner of André-Charles Boulle.

In 2016, a subsidiary company of Jean-Raymond Boulle discovered and has filed a patent for a new type of diamond inlay in keeping with Boulle work, subsequently produced by AkzoNobel for application on cars, planes and yachts.

The Inlaid Brass Ewer, signed by ʿAli ibn ʿAbdallah al-ʿAlawi, currently sits at the Museum of Islamic Art at the Pergamon Museum in Berlin, Germany. This 35 centimeter high jug can be dated back to the 13th century, during the Ayyubid dynasty, from about 1251-1275. It was produced in Mosul, in northern Iraq, a place that was known for its beautiful metalwork. The Inlaid Brass Ewer was used along with a basin, also signed by ʿAli ibn ʿAbdallah al-ʿAlawi, and both were most likely owned by a member of the higher class to wash their hands before dining at court. This ewer, along with a group of other inlaid brasses, can be associated with Mosul because of the abundance of artist signatures.

Technical Evaluation:
The workshops of Mosul were known to have the finest bronzes, including ewers, basins, candlesticks, and others. These bronzes were inlaid with silver and gold, and were decorated with intricate designs and inscriptions. While the technique of metalworking originated in Persia, the trade routes in Mosul shaped it. The earliest use of metalworking was with copper, but with the addition of zinc, copper became brass. In Islamic areas, brass was used to make large braziers and dishes, but soon became proficient in creating ewers, basins, and other bronzes. These would then be decorated with gold and silver through the technique of inlaying. The process of inlaying a precious metal on top of a less precious one is evident on most of the bronzes that came from Mosul.
A group of craftsman centered in Mosul created the Mosul school, which created an improved way of inlaying metals. This technique would bypass the earlier method of inlaying, especially when it came to silver. Strips of silver and gold were placed on undercut bronze and brass pieces in a way that when finished would show no irregularity. This technique was later brought to other cities, including Damascus.
The technique of Damascene, named after the city of Damascus, involved the metal being inlaid to be softer than the substrate metal; the look was created by hammering the metal into an undercut hard metal. By hammering in strips of gold and silver, the brass ewers had predetermined patterns that were decorated. The Inlaid Brass Ewer's patterns and inscriptions include thrones, riders, and planets with their zodiac signs, and are inlaid with silver and gold. The motifs and metal choices are very common for Mosul metalwork.

Inlay in stone

The natives of Kerma (c.2500 BCE to c.1500 BCE) developed techniques for architectural inlays and glazed quartzite.
Pietra dura is the usual term in Europe for detailed inlays in contrasting colours of stones, including many semi-precious types; parchin kari is an Indian term.  Pietra dura developed from the Roman Opus sectile, which was typically used on a larger scale, especially in floors.  Cosmatesque work on walls and floors, and smaller objects, was a medieval intermediate stage, continuing ancient opus alexandrinum.

Inlaid artifacts have come down to us from the Ancient Mayan civilization, among them, jade, mother of pearl and onyx inlaid into stone during the era that arts reached a peak during the seven centuries from 200 to 900 AD.

Inlay on fabrics

Vivienne Westwood created her Portrait Collection based on the furniture of Andre Charles Boulle.

Gallery

See also
Damascening
Intarsia
Marquetry
Mosaic
Niello
Parquetry

Notes

External links
 

Decorative arts
Surface decorative techniques in woodworking
Woodworking
Metalworking